was a town located in Shimotsuga District, Tochigi Prefecture, Japan.

As of 2003, the town had an estimated population of 18,472 and a density of 305.57 persons per km². The total area was 60.45 km².

On March 29, 2010, Fujioka, along with the towns of Ōhira and Tsuga (all from Shimotsuga District), was merged into the expanded city of Tochigi.

Famous people
Toshiaki Kawada, All Japan Pro Wrestling champion
Tochigiyama Moriya, 27th yokozuna in sumo

External links
 Tochigi official website 

Dissolved municipalities of Tochigi Prefecture